Rose Hill is an unincorporated community in Harris County, Texas, United States.

Education
Tomball Independent School District operates schools in the area. Zoned schools include:
 Rosehill Elementary School
 Tomball Intermediate School
 Tomball Junior High School
 Tomball High School
Rosehill includes a bilingual program.

Rosehill Christian School is in the area.

Lone Star College (originally the North Harris Montgomery Community College District) serves the community. The territory in Tomball ISD joined the community college district in 1982. The system operates the Fairbanks Center in unincorporated Harris County; Fairbanks Center is a part of Lone Star College–CyFair.

References

External links
 

Unincorporated communities in Harris County, Texas
Unincorporated communities in Texas